The Toneelacademie Maastricht, institute of performative arts is a college of dramatic arts located in the city of Maastricht in the Netherlands. It is part of the Zuyd University (Zuyd Hogeschool). The school is housed in a former Protestant orphanage in the historic Jekerkwartier in Maastricht.

The training found at the various academies of dramatic arts in the Netherlands comes under the heading Hoger Beroepsonderwijs (HBO), meaning Higher Professional Education. The Toneelacademie Maastricht, institute of performative arts, offers a 4-year Bachelor's programme and a 2-year postgraduate programme leading to a master's degree.

The Toneelacademie Maastricht, institute of performative arts has a solid reputation in the Netherlands. Many famous Dutch and Flemish theatre and film actors and directors, playwrights, scenographers, costume designers, and performers were educated there, including:
 Bram Bart
 Peter Blok
 Pierre Bokma
Maxime De Winne, Tijn Docter
Maria Goos
Boris van der Ham
Isa Hoes
Carice van Houten
Fedja van Huêt
Gaite Jansen
Ad van Kempen
Marwan Kenzari
Hans Kesting
Melody Klaver
Martijn Lakemeier
Sylvia Millecam
Jérôme Reehuis
Halina Reijn
Matthijs van de Sande Bakhuyzen
Willem van de Sande Bakhuyzen
Ariane Schluter,
Gijs Scholten van Aschat
Daan Schuurmans
Johan Simons (also as a professor)
Huub Stapel
Monique van de Ven
Dolf de Vries
Emmanuel Ohene Boafo
Jeroen Willems
Sylvia Hoeks, and many others.

See also
 Zuyd University
 Maastricht Academy of Fine Arts
 Maastricht Academy of Music
 Maastricht University
 Erasmus programme
 European Credit Transfer System (ECTS)
 European Higher Education Area

External links
Toneelacademie Maastricht | institute of performative arts

 
Education in Maastricht
Zuyd University of Applied Sciences
Drama schools in the Netherlands
Culture in Maastricht